The Commander, United States Air Forces Europe (COMUSAFE) is the most senior officer and head of the United States Air Forces in Europe.

List of USAFE commanders

References

See also 
List of United States Air Force four-star generals
List of commanders-in-chief of the Strategic Air Command
List of commanders of Tactical Air Command

United States Air Force lists
United States Air Force generals